Tom Tjaarda (born Stevens Thompson Tjaarda van Starkenburg; July 23, 1934 – June 2, 2017) was an American automobile designer noted for his work on a broad range of automobiles — estimated at over eighty — from exotic sports cars including the Ferrari 365 California, De Tomaso Pantera and Aston Martin Lagonda Coupé to high-volume popular cars including the first generation Ford Fiesta (1972) and the Fiat 124 Spider (1966).

For his work, Tjaarda was honored at the 1997 Pebble Beach Concours d'Elegance as well as the 1997 Concorso Italiano.

Jalopnik called Tjaarda "one of the defining automotive designers of the 20th century." Noted automotive designer and journalist Robert Cumberford called Tjaarda "one of the world’s most accomplished Italian car designers." Car Design News called him "one of the great unsung heroes of the car design world."

Background
Born in Detroit, Tjaarda was the son of Irene Tjaarda and Dutch auto designer John Tjaarda (born Joop Tjaarda van Starkenburg, 1897–1962), designer of the 1935 Lincoln Zephyr.

Tjaarda's parents divorced in 1939 and he lived with his mother in Detroit. Tjaarda studied high school in Birmingham High School, Birmingham, Michigan (1953 renamed to Seaholm High School).

Career
Tjaarda studied Architecture at the University of Michigan and presented an automobile (a sport station wagon) rather than building design for his senior thesis — winning an internship at Carrozzeria Ghia, the renowned Italian design house.

In 1958, he moved to Turin, Italy, where his career began and where he continued to live and work.

Tjaarda started his career at Ghia  with the Innocenti 950.

By 1961 had moved to Pininfarina, where he went on to work on designs that included the Chevrolet Corvette Rondine, the Ferrari 330GT 2+2, the Fiat 124 Spider, and the Ferrari 365 California.

He later returned to Ghia, where he designed the Isuzu Bellett MX1600 concept, the De Tomaso Pantera, and the De Tomaso Longchamp.

In 1981, Tom was appointed as Director of Fiat Advanced Studios.  In 1984,  he started his own independent design firm, Dimensione Design.

Design portfolio

 1959. Ghia Selene I 
 1960. Innocenti 950 S Ghia Spider
 1960. (Innocenti) Ghia IXG Dragster
 1960. Renault Dauphine Ghia Coupé
 1960. VW Karmann Ghia 1500 (type 34) Coupé (rear design; main body design by Sergio Sartorelli)
 1961. Ferbedo Automobilina pedal car (Ghia)
 1961. Ghia Cart
 1961. Innocenti 1100 Ghia Coupé
 1962. Chevrolet Corvair Pininfarina Coupé (I)
 1963. Chevrolet Corvette Rondine Pininfarina Coupé (I)
 1963. Fiat 2300 Pininfarina
 1963. Lancia Flaminia 2.8 Pininfarina Coupé Speciale
 1964. Chevrolet Corvette Rondine Pininfarina Coupé (II)
 1964. Ferrari 330 GT 2+2 Pininfarina series 1
 1964. Mercedes 230 SL Pininfarina Coupé
 1965. Fiat 124 Sport Spider Pininfarina
 1966. Ferrari 365 California
 1968. Ghia Centurion (with Giorgetto Giugiaro and Rowan Industries)
 1968. Serenissima Coupé (Ghia)
 1969. De Tomaso Mustela (I) (Ghia)
 1969. Isuzu Bellett MX1600 GT (Ghia)
 1969. Lancia Flaminia Marica (Ghia)
 1969. Lancia Fulvia 1600 HF Competizione (Ghia)
 1970. De Tomaso Deauville (Ghia)
 1970. De Tomaso Pantera Ghia
 1970. Sinthesis 2000 Berlinetta
 1970. Williams De Tomaso-Ford (Cosworth) 505/38 (De Tomaso Formula 1)
 1971. All-Cars AutoZodiaco Damaca
 1971. De Tomaso 1600 (Ghia) Spider
 1971. De Tomaso Zonda (Ghia)
 1971. Isuzu Bellett SportsWagon (Ghia)
 1972. De Tomaso Longchamp
 1972. Ford Fiesta (Ghia, Project "Wolf")
 1973. De Tomaso Pantera 7X (Montella, Ghia)
 1973. Ford Mustela (II) (Ghia)
 1974. Ford Ghia Coins
 1974. Ford Maverick
 1979. Fiat Brazil
 1979. Ford Mustang II Proposals (Ghia) (different variants)
 1979. Zastava (facelifts of older Fiat-based models for Yugoslavia)
 1980. De Tomaso Longchamp Cabrio
 1981. SEAT Ronda
 1981. SEAT Guappa Coupé
 1982. Chrysler LeBaron
 1982. Chrysler Imperial
 1983. Rayton-Fissore Taxi Torino
 1985. Autobianchi/Lancia Y10
 1985. Chrysler Jeep (Interior)
 1985. Rayton-Fissore Magnum 4x4
 1989. Aston Martin Lagonda Coupé
 1988. PPG 4x4 (USA)
 1989. Laforza Magnum 4x4
 1989. Zastava Utility vehicle
 1991. Bitter Tasco
 1992. Saab 900 four door
 1992. Suzuki Coupé (for Bugatti)
 1993. Fiat Iveco Truck Interior
 1995. Lamborghini Diablo (Interior)
 1998. Isotta-Fraschini T8 Coupé
 1998. Isotta-Fraschini T12 Coupé
 2000. Qvale Mangusta (II)
 2001. Laforza PSV (II) (production engineering only)
 2002. Spyker GT Sport
 2003. Fiat Barchetta (Facelift)
 2006. Shelby Series 2
 2007. Tjaarda Mustang

References

External links
 www.tom-tjaarda.net
 https://web.archive.org/web/20101230104914/http://www.conceptcars.it/stilisti/tjaarda.htm
 http://www.coachbuilt.com/des/t/tjaarda/tjaarda_tom.htm
 Tjaarda Mustang - https://web.archive.org/web/20120426081840/http://www.hstintl.com/index.php?menu=1
 http://www.fiat124spider.com

1934 births
2017 deaths
People from Detroit
American automobile designers
Taubman College of Architecture and Urban Planning alumni
American people of Dutch descent